Koramşalı (former Kirazlı) is a village in Mersin Province, Turkey.

Geography 
Koramşalı is a part of Erdemli district of Mersin Province. At  it is situated in the valley of Alata creek. Lately a road was constructed to Saklı şelale  waterfalls next to the village.

History 
On the east of a plateau, Koramşalı is quite secluded, and, although not fully investigated, it seems to have a rich history. In the vicinity of the village there are ancient graves as well as caves which are thought to be inhabited in the ancient ages. There are also Roman age rock tanks for must and vine. An undated stone bridge may also be a Roman bridge. Although there are 5-6 century-old sycamore trees within the village, the exact founding date of the present village is not known.

Economy 
Koramşalı is a typical agricultural village. Tomato, peach, cherry, nut and pomegranate are main products. Pomegranate syrup is also produced. The secondary economic activity is cattle breeding

References

Villages in Erdemli District